is a Japanese manga series written and illustrated by Daisuke Higuchi. The series was published in Shueisha's Weekly Shōnen Jump from March 1998 to October 2002. The series was adapted into a 39-episode anime television series broadcast exclusively by Animax across Japan and South Korea. In North America, the series was licensed for English language release by Viz Media. A sequel, titled Whistle! W, ran in Shogakukan's Ura Sunday and MangaONE web platforms from September 2016 to April 2021.

Plot

Whistle! is about a middle school boy named Shō Kazamatsuri.  He transfers from Musashinomori School to Sakura Jōsui Junior High School for better hopes to make the soccer team, since he never got a game at his old school due to his small stature.  Yūko Katori, his teacher, introduces him as a former star of the famed Musashinomori team, causing his classmates to be wrongly ecstatic.  Right after that, one of the players, Tatsuya Mizuno, reveals that he was never a regular.  In other words, since he never got the chance to play, Shō is a poor player. Shō struggles to improve his skill so he can make the team at his new school and to ignore the drastic disadvantage he has due to his height.

Media

Manga

Whistle! is written and illustrated Daisuke Higuchi. The series was published in Shueisha's Weekly Shōnen Jump from March 9, 1998, to October 21, 2002. Its 212 chapters were collected into twenty-four tankōbon volumes by Shueisha and released between July 3, 1998, and March 4, 2003. In North America, the series was licensed for English release by Viz Media. The twenty-four volumes were released from October 12, 2004, to January 2010.

A sequel manga, title , started in Shogakukan's Ura Sunday manga website on September 26, 2016. The manga went on hiatus in April 2019 due to Higuchi's health issues. The series resumed publication after nearly two years on February 8, 2021, and finished on April 5, 2021. Shogakukan collected its chapters in five tankobon volumes, released from to May 19, 2017, to May 19, 2021.

Anime
A 39-episode anime television series adaptation aired in Japan on Animax from May 5, 2002, to February 3, 2003. The opening and ending themes are "Double Wind" and "Sweet Days" respectively, both performed by Minako Komukai. In 2016, a new Japanese audio track for the anime was aired.

Video games
Games include: Game Boy Advance and PlayStation versions.

Stage adaptation
A stage play adaptation was announced in February 2016 for a late August to early September release.

Reception
The Whistle! series has received good reception. A review by Greg McElhatton of Read About Comics stated that the Whistle! manga had good drawings that showed the characters move around with the soccer ball during matches. David Welsh of Precocious Curmudgeon said the series is very interesting that those who do not have soccer background will enjoy reading the manga, as well as with the realistic illustration used.

Scott Campbell and Holly Ellingwood of Active Anime have remarked that the art is clear since all the "line and detail has obvious care and attention given to it, resulting in well-managed visuals for a well-flowing read.", while praising Sho's character development as the readers "see him strive against so much to obtain what he worked for is uplifting." Eduardo M. Chavez's review on Whistle! Volume 1 noted that although it does not look good for characters to run away from their problems, Sho's inner determination to play soccer is the main highlight of the series.

References

External links

  
 Whistle! at Marvelous Entertainment 
 

1998 manga
2002 anime television series debuts
Animax original programming
Association football in anime and manga
Fictional association football television series
School life in anime and manga
Shogakukan manga
Shōnen manga
Shueisha manga
Viz Media manga